A rosarium is a rose garden. It may also refer to:

Religion
 Rosary (Latin: rosarium, in the sense of "crown/garland of roses"), an aspect of Catholic devotion
 Rosarium Virginis Mariae, an Apostolic Letter by Pope John Paul II, declaring October 2002 to October 2003 the "Year of the Rosary"
 Rosary of the Philosophers (Rosarium philosophorum sive pretiosissimum donum Dei), a 16th-century alchemical treatise

Specific rose gardens
 Europa-Rosarium, formerly the Rosarium Sangerhausen, in Sangerhausen, Saxony-Anhalt, Germany
 Rosarium Uetersen in the Rosenstadt Uetersen, Schleswig-Holstein, Germany

Biology
 Ctenotus rosarium, a species of skink found in Queensland, Australia
 Hexaplex rosarium, a species of sea snail

See also
 Rose Garden (disambiguation)
 Rosaria (disambiguation)
 Rosario (disambiguation)
 Rosarius (disambiguation)